The United Verde mine was one of the largest copper mines in the United States.

The mine was located in the town of Jerome in central Arizona, in the southwestern United States.

The mine produced over 2 billion pounds of copper, silver, and gold.

References 

Copper mines in Arizona